This list of film awards for lead actress is an index to articles that describe awards given to the leading actresses in films, typically called the "Best Actress" award. The list is organized by region and country of the venue or sponsor of the award, but some awards are not limited to films or actresses from that country.

Africa

Americas

Asia

Europe

Oceania

See also

 Best Actress
 Lists of awards
 Lists of acting awards
 List of awards for actresses
 List of film awards

References

 
Actress, lead
film, lead actress